Đuro "Đuka" Agić (17 August 1906 – 15 January 1985) was a Croatian footballer.

International career
He made his debut for the Kingdom of Yugoslavia in a January 1930 Balkan Cup match against Greece, which remained his sole international game.

References

External links

1906 births
1985 deaths
Footballers from Zagreb
Association football defenders
Croatian footballers
Yugoslav footballers
Yugoslavia international footballers
HŠK Concordia players
Yugoslav First League players